Franziska Koch may refer to:
 Franziska Romana Koch (1748–1796), German ballet dancer, soprano and actress
 Franziska Koch (cyclist) (born 2000), German cyclist